The Battle of Village Creek occurred on May 24, 1841, on the embankments of Village Creek. The battle, which evolved into a running gunfight between the Republic of Texas militia and the Village Creek tribes, was attributed to the increased Native American raids on Anglo settlements in the Red River counties.

Village Creek

The Village Creek area is a stem of the West Fork Trinity River. The water stream routes southwest from Arlington, Texas, and tapers just south of Cross Timber, Texas.

The Trinity River tributary, which extends 23 miles to the south of the West Fork Trinity River, provided a sanctuary for many Indian tribes. The Caddos, Cherokees, and Tonkawas established a series of habitats or villages along the banks of Village Creek.

Village Creek conflict
On May 14, 1841, General Edward H. Tarrant organized a company of about 70 volunteers from the Red River counties at Fort Johnston. The Republic of Texas militia had scouting detachments which were commanded by Captains John B. Denton, Henry B. Stout,  and James G. Bourland.

During the morning hours of May 24, 1841, the militia force encroached the Village Creek area from the south in the vicinity of Cross Timber, Texas. After capturing a native inhabitant who provided locations of the area villages, Captains Denton, Stout,  and Bourland led scouting units north toward the West Fork Trinity River. The militia volunteers carried out the command of burning huts along the creek banks.

As the scouting detachments progressed north, the command encountered larger villages and an increasingly stronger tribal force. Captains Denton and Stout were wounded near thickets bordering the Trinity River. Captain Denton was the only fatality, while Captain Stout and Captain Griffith were wounded. 

The Village Creek tribes had twelve fatalities, while many of the inhabitants were wounded during the conflict.

Bird's Fort treaty
On September 29, 1843, the Treaty of Bird's Fort was agreed upon at Fort Bird between the Village Creek tribes and the Republic of Texas, which opened the Red River counties for settlement by frontier pioneers.

Archeological research

Archeological excavations have been conducted within the Village Creek area. Prehistoric artifacts have been discovered which date back around 9000 years, indicating a culture of food-gatherers, hunters, and village inhabitants.

Today, much of the Village Creek conflict site is beneath Lake Arlington, which has a surface area of 1,939 acres and was impounded in 1957.

Historical record
The Village Creek battlefield received a historic marker in 1936.

The Village Creek area was recognized as an archeological site and received a historic marker in 1980.

References

Village Creek
Battle of Village Creek
Village Creek
Village Creek
May 1841 events